Neutrophilic lobular panniculitis is a cutaneous condition characterized by inflammation of the subcutaneous fat.

See also 
 Bowel-associated dermatosis–arthritis syndrome
 List of cutaneous conditions

References 

Conditions of the subcutaneous fat
Reactive neutrophilic cutaneous conditions